Marājil (d. 786) was an umm walad of caliph Harun al-Rashid and mother of caliph al-Ma'mun.

Biography
Marajil was a Persian slave concubine of Abbasid prince Harun (future Caliph Harun al-Rashid). According to one account, she had entered the Abbasid household as a prisoner of war. Marajil was raised in the Abbasid household before being given as a concubine to prince Harun. She was one or two years younger than Harun.

Marajil's only child, Abdallah (the future al-Ma'mun), was born in Baghdad on the night of the 13 to 14 September 786 CE to Harun al-Rashid and his concubine Marajil, from Badghis. On the same night, which later became known as the "night of the three caliphs", his uncle Al-Hadi died and was succeeded by Ma'mun's father, Harun al-Rashid, as ruler of the Abbasid Caliphate. Harun became caliph in 786 when he was in his early twenties. At the time, he was tall, good looking, and slim but strongly built, with wavy hair and olive skin. Upon his accession, Harun led Friday prayers in Baghdad's Great Mosque and then sat publicly as officials and the layman alike lined up to swear allegiance and declare their happiness at his ascent to Amir al-Mu'minin. He began his reign by appointing very able ministers, who carried on the work of the government so well that they greatly improved the condition of the people. Marajil witnessed the accession of Harun and she received title Umm Abdallah from the Caliph. However, on the night of Harun's accession to the throne, in September 786 her health started deteriorating after birth of Abdallah.

Marajil died soon after his birth, and Abdallah was raised by Harun al-Rashid's wife, Zubayda, herself of high Abbasid lineage as the granddaughter of Caliph al-Mansur. Marajil connection to Khurasan became her major contribution to Al-Ma'mun's career.

See also
 Al-Abbas ibn al-Ma'mun

References

Sources
 
 
 
 

8th-century births
786 deaths
Concubines of the Abbasid caliphs
Harun al-Rashid
8th-century women from the Abbasid Caliphate
Medieval slaves
Mothers of Abbasid caliphs